Linganore may refer to a place in the eastern United States:

Linganore Creek, a tributary of the Monocacy River
Linganore, Maryland, a census-designated place surrounding Lake Linganore, a reservoir on Linganore Creek
Lake Linganore, Maryland, residential community roughly corresponding to the Linganore CDP
Linganore-Bartonsville, Maryland, a former census-designated place
Linganore AVA, an American Viticultural Area in parts of Frederick and Carroll counties, Maryland
Linganore Farm, listed on the National Register of Historic Places in Frederick, Maryland
Linganore High School, a high school in eastern Frederick County, Maryland